St. John the Baptist Cathedral is one of the most significant historic monuments of Trnava, western Slovakia.

History 
The Cathedral is the first purely Baroque building built in present-day Slovakia. It is part of a complex of academical buildings. The donor of this Cathedral, Miklós Eszterházy, entrusted its construction to the Italian masters Antonio and Pietro Spazzi in 1629. The not-yet-finished cathedral was consecrated in 1637.

Above its main portal there is a shield with figures of seated angels and the stoned crest of the Esterházy family.

The interior of the Cathedral amazes a visitor with its massiveness and variety of unique paintings. The main area has barrel vaults with lunettes, while in the chapels on both sides of nave can be found cloister vaults.

The biggest treasure of the whole interior is the colossal main altar which was finished in 1640. On its realisation participated besides the Austrian master B. Knilling and V. Knoth also V. Stadler from Trnava and master Ferdinand from Cífer.

The painters and stuccoer's decoration of the interior is the work of artists G. B. Rossa, G. Tornini and P. Conti. The ceiling’s paintings are by the north Italian painters F. I. Grafenstein and C. Ricchi (Source Dr. Medvecky, 2008).

The church doesn’t hold only spiritual functions; there were many theological treatises and graduations. Very interesting also are the catacombs with graves.

In December 1978 Pope John Paul II established the church as the Cathedral of the Archdiocese of Trnava. The name of the archdiocese was changed in 1995 to the Archdiocese of Bratislava-Trnava and in 2008 changed back to the Archdiocese of Trnava.  Pope John Paul II visited the cathedral on November 9, 2003.

See also
 List of cathedrals in Slovakia
 List of Jesuit sites

References

Roman Catholic churches completed in 1640
17th-century Roman Catholic church buildings in Slovakia
Roman Catholic cathedrals in Slovakia
Buildings and structures in Trnava
Churches in Trnava Region
1640 establishments in Europe